Verse Chorus Verse is an unreleased live album by the American grunge band Nirvana, once scheduled for release on November 1, 1994. It was to be a double album comprising a CD of live performances on one CD and Nirvana's MTV Unplugged performance on the other. It was canceled as Nirvana members Krist Novoselic and Dave Grohl found it overwhelming to compile material so soon after the death of Kurt Cobain earlier that year.

The subsequent track listing differs greatly from the track listing that was eventually released on 1996's From the Muddy Banks of the Wishkah. The title of the album is a sarcastic acknowledgement of the band's standard rock-song format and also comes from a Nirvana song of the same name that appeared on 1993's No Alternative benefit album. Concept art for the album by the band's art director and designer, Robert Fisher, was posted online in late 2019.

Development

Nirvana's record label DGC announced Verse Chorus Verse in August 1994. It was to be a double album, with live material from throughout Nirvana's career on one CD and their MTV Unplugged performance on the other, and was due for release on November 1 that year. In the United Kingdom, Music Week reported in October, 1994, that Verse Chorus Verse would be released two weeks before Nirvana's first home video, Live! Tonight! Sold Out!!, which was released there on November 14, 1994, and that the two releases would be promoted together. However, Nirvana bassist Krist Novoselic and drummer Dave Grohl found assembling the material so soon after Cobain's death emotionally overwhelming. Cashbox magazine announced that the album was being compiled in the September 3, 1994 issue, and then announced in the following issue dated September 10, 1994 that the plan had changed and that only the MTV Unplugged performance would be released.

Jim Merlis, head of Geffen, said releases were planned due to high demand for new Nirvana recordings and the fact that the band's "Unplugged" set was already being widely bootlegged.

Although DGC had given the impression that the work on the live part had not progressed very far, and was why it was cancelled early on,  Jim Merlis, in a 1997 article for Goldmine by Gillian Gaar, insisted that it was all complete bar mixing: “It was a whole cohesive album. And it’s different from the one that came out later [Wishkah]. They went back and started at square one with this [in 1996] because they gained a little perspective on it.” There was also a television advertisement made for the album.

Track listing

Disc 1

Disc 2: "MTV Unplugged In New York"
Track listing and times taken from advanced cassette.  Recorded at Sony Music Studios in New York City on November 18, 1993.

Personnel
Disc 1:
Nirvana
Kurt Cobain – vocals, guitar
Krist Novoselic – bass
Chad Channing - drums on "Sappy (Verse Chorus Verse)", "Spank Thru", and "Dive".
Dave Grohl – drums on  all tracks, except tracks 6,8, and track 12. 
Additional musicians
Pat Smear – rhythm guitar on "Serve The Servants", "Heart-Shaped Box", "School" and "Scentless Apprentice".
Lori Goldston  – cello on "Blew".

Disc 2:
Nirvana
Kurt Cobain – lead vocals, acoustic guitar, except on tracks 10, 11, and 12.
Krist Novoselic – acoustic bass, accordion on track 3, acoustic rhythm guitar on tracks 10, 11, and 12.
Dave Grohl – drums, backing vocals, acoustic bass on track 3.
Pat Smear – acoustic guitar, except on tracks 5, 10, 11, and 12.
Additional musicians
Lori Goldston – cello, except on tracks 1, 2, 5, 10, 11, and 12.
Meat Puppets
Cris Kirkwood – acoustic bass and backing vocals on tracks 10, 11, and 12.
Curt Kirkwood – acoustic lead guitar on tracks 10, 11, and 12.

Gallery

References

External links
Verse Chorus Verse Promotional Television Advertisement

Verse Chorus Verse
Verse Chorus Verse
Unreleased albums